The Pioneer Collegiate Lacrosse League (PCLL) was a conference in the Men's Collegiate Lacrosse Association (MCLA). The PCLL primarily incorporates teams in New England and New York and is divided into two divisions, Division 1 and Division 2 (formerly A & B). The conference is governed by a five-member executive board and the teams that win the conference's divisional playoffs receive bids to the MCLA National Tournament. Before the 2019 season, the conference merged with the Central Collegiate Lacrosse Association (CCLA) to form the Continental Lacrosse Conference (CLC).

History
In the spring of 1984, players from 15 colleges competed in a club All-Star game held at Dean College. It was during this event that the idea of hosting a New England college club championship germinated. Over the next year meetings between the club lacrosse programs in the New England region were held and by the spring of 1986, four teams gathered at Dean College for a single elimination tournament. In the semi-final match-ups, Boston University defeated the University of Connecticut, 6-5, and Dean College defeated the University of Rhode Island, 14-2. That same day, Dean College became the first "New England Club Champion", defeating Boston University by a score of 6-5.

After two years of successful tournaments, six teams petitioned the US Intercollegiate Lacrosse Association (USILA) and the New England Intercollegiate Lacrosse Association (NEILA) for sanctioning of the league. In 1987, Assumption College, Bentley College, Clark University, Dean College, Roger Williams University and Worcester Polytechnic Institute founded the Patriot Lacrosse League. The league's original purpose was to provide structure and legitimacy to the member teams, hoping their institutions would elevate them to varsity status. Five of those six founding Patriot League members were able to obtain their goal. During the spring of 1988, the first Patriot League Championship was played. Dean College defeated Bentley 18-9.

The following year, although Roger Williams departed, the University of Rhode Island and Bryant College were accepted into the league. In the spring of 1990, University of Connecticut and Northeastern University joined the league and at the USILA's request to avoid confusion with the NCAA's Patriot League, the league changed its name to the Pioneer Lacrosse League.

The Pioneer operated along the same lines for the next several seasons. Teams left the league to compete at the varsity level in the NCAA while new teams joined to fill their place. In the fall of 2000, the league underwent a major change by officially joining what was then known as the US Lacrosse Intercollegiate Associates (USLIA). That same year, the University of New Hampshire defeated Boston University to earn the league's first automatic qualification and represent the PCLL at its first national tournament as members of the USLIA. In St. Louis, Missouri. In 2006 the USLIA became the Men's Collegiate Lacrosse Association (MCLA).

In August 2018, the MCLA announced its intention to merge the Pioneer Collegiate Lacrosse League and the Central Collegiate Lacrosse League (CCLA)  to form a new conference, the Continental Lacrosse Conference (CLC).

Championship records

Division I

Division II 

1 Division B only included one team (University of New Haven) in 2004 and therefore did not have playoffs.2 The PCLL(B) did not receive an automatic bid to nationals.

3 The PCLL(B) did not receive an automatic bid to nationals.

4 Coast Guard Academy received an at-large bid to nationals.

Final Teams

Division 1

Division 2

Former teams
Assumption College (Worcester, Massachusetts)
Bentley College (Waltham, Massachusetts)
Bryant College (Smithfield, Rhode Island)
Clark University (Worcester, Massachusetts)
Dean College (Franklin, Massachusetts)
New York University (New York City, New York)
Roger Williams University (Bristol, Rhode Island)
Salem State College (Salem, Massachusetts)
University of Massachusetts Lowell (Lowell, Massachusetts)
University of Rochester (Rochester, New York)
University of Vermont (Burlington, Vermont)
Framingham State College (Framingham, Massachusetts)
Boston University (Boston, Massachusetts)

References

External links
Official PCLL website
Official MCLA website

College lacrosse leagues in the United States